Rabochaya Pyatiletka was a  constructivist building in Tsentralny City District of Novosibirsk, Russia. It was located on the corner of Kamenskaya and Chaplygin streets. The building was constructed in 1930.

History
In 1930, the building was built for 250 residents.

The building was demolished on 5 January 2019.

See also
 Aeroflot House
 Polyclinic No. 1
 Soyuzzoloto House

References

Tsentralny City District, Novosibirsk
Buildings and structures in Novosibirsk
Residential buildings completed in 1930
Constructivist architecture
Demolished buildings and structures in Russia
Buildings and structures demolished in 2019